The Center for Promoting Ideas (CPI) is an organization that engages in predatory publishing. Run out of Bangladesh with a claimed office in New York, it publishes a number of journals that publish academic articles for payment, claiming they are "peer-reviewed and refereed". Like many predatory journals it operates under the guise of an Open access model. The Chronicle of Higher Education reported in 2018 that authors wired money to Bangladesh and sometimes never saw their paper published, or edited poorly. In addition, the CPI habitually lists unwitting academics as editors in chief or members of the editorial board, against their wishes. 

One such scholar is American academic J. Peter Pham, who has been listed as on the editorial board of the International Journal of Humanities and Social Science since 2011, despite having sent letters asking to be removed. , he is still listed.

Journals published by the CPI
Predatory journals often take an existing journal's name and put "International" in front of it, according to an editorial in the Journal of Nuclear Cardiology. Journals published by the CPI are listed on Beall's list.

Titles found on CPI website:
American International Journal of Contemporary Research
American International Journal of Social Science
International Journal of Applied Science and Technology
International Journal of Business and Social Science
International Journal of Business, Humanities and Technology
International Journal of Humanities and Social Science
International Journal of Language & Linguistics
Journal of Agriculture & Life Sciences
Journal of Business & Economic Policy
Journal of Education & Social Policy

References

Open access publishers